De Stijl, Dutch for "The Style", also known as Neoplasticism, was a Dutch art movement founded in 1917 in Leiden. De Stijl consisted of artists and architects.  In a more narrow sense, the term De Stijl is used to refer to a body of work from 1917 to 1931 founded in the Netherlands. Proponents of De Stijl advocated pure abstraction and universality by a reduction to the essentials of form and colour; they simplified visual compositions to vertical and horizontal, using only black, white and primary colors.

De Stijl is also the name of a journal that was published by the Dutch painter, designer, writer, and critic Theo van Doesburg that served to propagate the group's theories. Along with van Doesburg, the group's principal members were the painters Piet Mondrian, Vilmos Huszár, Bart van der Leck, and the architects Gerrit Rietveld, Robert van 't Hoff, and J. J. P. Oud. The artistic philosophy that formed a basis for the group's work is known as Neoplasticism—the new plastic art (or Nieuwe Beelding in Dutch).

According to Theo van Doesburg in the introduction of the magazine De Stijl 1917 no.1, the "De Stijl"-movement was a reaction to the "Modern Baroque" of the Amsterdam School movement (Dutch expressionist architecture) with the magazine Wendingen (1918–1931).

Principles and influences 

Mondrian sets forth the delimitations of Neoplasticism in his essay "Neo-Plasticism in Pictorial Art". He writes, "this new plastic idea will ignore the particulars of appearance, that is to say, natural form and colour. On the contrary, it should find its expression in the abstraction of form and colour, that is to say, in the straight line and the clearly defined primary colour". With these constraints, his art allows only primary colours and non-colours, only squares and rectangles, only straight and horizontal or vertical lines. The De Stijl movement posited the fundamental principle of the geometry of the straight line, the square, and the rectangle, combined with a strong asymmetricality; the predominant use of pure primary colors with black and white; and the relationship between positive and negative elements in an arrangement of non-objective forms and lines.

The name De Stijl is supposedly derived from Gottfried Semper's Der Stil in den technischen und tektonischen Künsten oder Praktische Ästhetik (1861–3), which Curl suggests was mistakenly believed to advocate materialism and functionalism. The "plastic vision" of De Stijl artists, also called Neo-Plasticism, saw itself as reaching beyond the changing appearance of natural things to bring an audience into intimate contact with an immutable core of reality, a reality that was not so much a visible fact as an underlying spiritual vision. In general, De Stijl proposed ultimate simplicity and abstraction, both in architecture and painting, by using only straight horizontal and vertical lines and rectangular forms. Furthermore, their formal vocabulary was limited to the primary colours, red, yellow, and blue, and the three primary values, black, white, and grey. The works avoided symmetry and attained aesthetic balance by the use of opposition. This element of the movement embodies the second meaning of stijl: "a post, jamb or support"; this is best exemplified by the construction of crossing joints, most commonly seen in carpentry.

In many of the group's three-dimensional works, vertical and horizontal lines are positioned in layers or planes that do not intersect, thereby allowing each element to exist independently and unobstructed by other elements. This feature can be found in the Rietveld Schröder House and the Red and Blue Chair.

De Stijl was influenced by Cubist painting as well as by the mysticism and the ideas about "ideal" geometric forms (such as the "perfect straight line") in the neoplatonic philosophy of mathematician M. H. J. Schoenmaekers. The De Stijl movement was also influenced by Neopositivism.  The works of De Stijl would influence the Bauhaus style and the international style of architecture as well as clothing and interior design. However, it did not follow the general guidelines of an "-ism" (e.g., Cubism, Futurism, Surrealism), nor did it adhere to the principles of art schools like the Bauhaus; it was a collective project, a joint enterprise.

In music, De Stijl was an influence only on the work of composer Jakob van Domselaer, a close friend of Mondrian. Between 1913 and 1916, he composed his Proeven van Stijlkunst ("Experiments in Artistic Style"), inspired mainly by Mondrian's paintings. This minimalistic—and, at the time, revolutionary—music defined "horizontal" and "vertical" musical elements and aimed at balancing those two principles. Van Domselaer was relatively unknown in his lifetime, and did not play a significant role within De Stijl.

History

Early history 
From the flurry of new art movements that followed the Impressionist revolutionary new perception of painting, Cubism arose in the early 20th century as an important and influential new direction. In the Netherlands, too, there was interest in this "new art".

However, because the Netherlands remained neutral in World War I, Dutch artists were not able to leave the country after 1914 and were thus effectively isolated from the international art world—and in particular, from Paris, which was its centre then.

During that period, Theo van Doesburg started looking for other artists to set up a journal and start an art movement. Van Doesburg was also a writer, poet, and critic, who had been more successful writing about art than working as an independent artist. Quite adept at making new contacts due to his flamboyant personality and outgoing nature, he had many useful connections in the art world.

Founding of De Stijl 

Around 1915, Van Doesburg started meeting the artists who would eventually become the founders of the journal. He first met Piet Mondrian at an exhibition in Stedelijk Museum Amsterdam. Mondrian, who had moved to Paris in 1912 (and there, changed his name from "Mondriaan"), had been visiting the Netherlands when war broke out. He could not return to Paris, and was staying in the artists' community of Laren, where he met Bart van der Leck and regularly saw M. H. J. Schoenmaekers. In 1915, Schoenmaekers published Het nieuwe wereldbeeld ("The New Image of the World"), followed in 1916 by Beginselen der beeldende wiskunde ("Principles of Plastic Mathematics"). These two publications would greatly influence Mondrian and other members of De Stijl.

Van Doesburg also knew J. J. P. Oud and the Hungarian artist Vilmos Huszár. In 1917 the cooperation of these artists, together with the poet Antony Kok, resulted in the founding of De Stijl. The young architect Gerrit Rietveld joined the group in 1918.  At its height De Stijl had 100 members and the journal had a circulation of 300.

During those first few years, the group was still relatively homogeneous, although Van der Leck left in 1918 due to artistic differences of opinion. Manifestos were being published, signed by all members. The social and economic circumstances of the time formed an important source of inspiration for their theories, and their ideas about architecture were heavily influenced by Hendrik Petrus Berlage and Frank Lloyd Wright.

The name Nieuwe Beelding was a term first coined in 1917 by Mondrian, who wrote a series of twelve articles called De Nieuwe Beelding in de schilderkunst ("Neo-Plasticism in Painting") that were published in the journal De Stijl. In 1920 he published a book titled Le Néo-Plasticisme.

After 1920 

Around 1921, the group's character started to change. From the time of van Doesburg's association with Bauhaus, other influences started playing a role. These influences were mainly Malevich and Russian Constructivism, to which not all members agreed. In 1924 Mondrian broke with the group after van Doesburg proposed the theory of elementarism, suggesting that a diagonal line is more vital than horizontal and vertical ones. In addition, the De Stijl group acquired many new "members". Dadaist influences, such as I. K. Bonset's poetry and Aldo Camini's "antiphilosophy" generated controversy as well. Only after Van Doesburg's death was it revealed that Bonset and Camini were two of his pseudonyms.

After van Doesburg's death 

Theo van Doesburg died in Davos, Switzerland, in 1931. His wife, Nelly, administered his estate.

Because of van Doesburg's pivotal role within De Stijl, the group did not survive. Individual members remained in contact, but De Stijl could not exist without a strong central character. Thus, it may be wrong to think of De Stijl as a close-knit group of artists. The members knew each other, but most communication took place by letter. For example, Mondrian and Rietveld never met in person.

Many, though not all, artists did stay true to the movement's basic ideas, even after 1931. Rietveld, for instance, continued designing furniture according to De Stijl principles, while Mondrian continued working in the style he had initiated around 1920. Van der Leck, on the other hand, went back to figurative compositions after his departure from the group.

Influence on architecture 
The De Stijl influence on architecture remained considerable long after its inception; Mies van der Rohe was among the most important proponents of its ideas. Between 1923 and 1924, Rietveld designed the Rietveld Schröder House, the only building to have been created completely according to De Stijl principles. Examples of Stijl-influenced works by J.J.P. Oud can be found in Rotterdam and Hook of Holland. Other examples include the Eames House by Charles and Ray Eames, and the interior decoration for the Aubette dance hall in Strasbourg, designed by Sophie Taeuber-Arp, Jean Arp and van Doesburg.

Present day 
Works by De Stijl members are scattered all over the world, but De Stijl-themed exhibitions are organised regularly. Museums with large De Stijl collections include the Gemeentemuseum in The Hague (which owns the world's most extensive, although not exclusively De Stijl-related, Mondrian collection) and Amsterdam's Stedelijk Museum, where many works by Rietveld and Van Doesburg are on display. The  Museum of Utrecht has the largest Rietveld collection worldwide; it also owns the Rietveld Schröder House, Rietveld's adjacent "show house", and the Rietveld Schröder Archives.

The movement inspired the design aesthetics of Rumyantsevo and Salaryevo stations of Moscow Metro opened in 2016.

Neoplasticists 

 Ilya Bolotowsky (1907–1981), painter and sculptor
 Burgoyne Diller (1906–1965), painter
 Theo van Doesburg (1883–1931), painter, designer, and writer; co-founder of De Stijl movement; published De Stijl, 1917–1931
 Cornelis van Eesteren (1897–1981), architect
 Jean Gorin (1899–1981), painter, sculptor
 Robert van 't Hoff (1887–1979), architect
 Vilmos Huszár (1884–1960), painter
 Frederick John Kiesler (1890–1965), architect, theater designer, artist, sculptor
 Antony Kok (1882–1969), poet
 Bart van der Leck (1876–1958), painter
 Piet Mondrian (1872–1944), painter, co-founder of De Stijl
 Marlow Moss (1889–1958), painter
 J. J. P. Oud (1890–1963), architect
 Gerrit Rietveld (1888–1964), architect and designer
 Kurt Schwitters (1887–1948), painter, sculptor
 Georges Vantongerloo (1886–1965), sculptor
 Friedrich Vordemberge-Gildewart (1899–1962), painter
 Jan Wils (1891–1972), architect

See also

 Art Concret 
 Abstraction-Création 
 Concrete art
 Form follows function 
 Fourth dimension in art
 Mathematics and art
 Modern architecture

References and sources 
 References

 Sources

Further reading

External links 

 Many sourced quotes and facts of De Stijl artists in: De Stijl 1917–1931 – The Dutch Contribution to Modern Art, by H.L.C. Jaffé; J.M. Meulenhoff, Amsterdam 1956
 De Stijl, The International Dada Archive, University of Iowa Libraries
 Jakob van Domselaer's Proeven van Stijlkunst, rare recording.
 Essay about Mondrian and mysticism Scans of the complete first volume of the journal.
 De Stijl Manifesto, Theo van Doesburg, 1918

1910s in the arts
1920s in the arts
1910s in the Netherlands
1920s in the Netherlands
20th-century architectural styles
20th-century Dutch artists
20th-century Dutch painters
Avant-garde magazines
 
Art movements
Art movements in Dutch painting
Avant-garde art
Architecture magazines
Architecture groups
Dutch artist groups and collectives
Dutch architectural styles
Dutch-language magazines
Dutch painting
Magazines established in 1917
Magazines published in Amsterdam
Modern art
Piet Mondrian